Monto Bello is a small town in the south of the Republic of Congo.

Railways 

Mont Belo is also the railway junction for the branchline to Mbinda.

See also 

 Railway stations in Congo

References 

Populated places in the Republic of the Congo